Interstate 20 in Texas (I-20) is a major east–west Interstate Highway in the Southern United States, running east from a junction with I-10 east of Kent, Texas, through the Dallas–Fort Worth metroplex to the border with Louisiana near Waskom, Texas. I-20 is known as the Ronald Reagan Memorial Highway within the Dallas–Fort Worth metroplex.

History
I-20 in Texas was designated in 1959, and was to replace or run parallel to U.S. Route 80 (US 80). Initial construction began from east to west and as bypass loops around larger cities. On October 1, 1964, I-20 was rerouted so that it followed I-35W through Fort Worth (it still followed I-35E through Dallas). By 1967, the highway was complete from the Louisiana border to the western side of Fort Worth on a route to the south of US 80, with slower construction in the lesser populated areas of West Texas concurrent with US 80. On December 2, 1971, I-20 was rerouted across the southern side of the Dallas–Fort Worth metroplex, with the old section through downtown Dallas and Fort Worth being redesignated as I-30. In 1991, the entire concurrent designation of US 80 was removed from the I-10 interchange to Dallas.

Route description

West Texas
I-20 leaves the interchange with I-10 with a speed limit of  until milemarker 89. I-20 also generally heads to the east-northeast passing by the cities of Odessa and Midland while transitioning from the West Texas desert to the prairie. I-20 runs concurrently with the La Entrada al Pacífico corridor from its junction with US 385 in Odessa to its junction with Farm to Market Road 1788 (FM 1788) near Midland International Airport. Near Sweetwater, I-20 begins to head east as it heads toward the city of Abilene. In Abilene, I-20 curves toward the north and transverses the northern part of the city while also forming the northern arc of the loop around the city. I-20 continues heading east from Abilene until the town of Eastland when I-20 takes a more northeasterly route toward Weatherford while transitioning from the West Texas prairie to the central plains of North Texas as the terrain grows hilly. In Weatherford, I-20 again heads back toward the east as it heads toward the Dallas–Fort Worth metroplex.

Dallas–Fort Worth area

I-20 interchanges with I-30 west of Fort Worth with I-30 heading east and I-20 to the southeast. I-20 heads back toward the east when it interchanges with I-820. I-20 forms the southern arc of the complete loop around the city of Fort Worth, and serves as the southernmost west–east freeway in the Dallas–Fort Worth metroplex. Interchanging with I-35W south of downtown Fort Worth, I-20 heads east toward Dallas passing through Arlington, where it is also known as the Ronald Reagan Memorial Highway. From Arlington, I-20 passes into Dallas County at Grand Prairie and heads east in to Dallas, interchanging with I-35E south of downtown and I-45 shortly after. I-20 intersects with I-635 (where it completes a three-quarter loop around the city) on Dallas' southeast side before heading east toward East Texas. The Interstate varies from 4 to 10 lanes from its I-30 junction near Aledo to its US 80 junction near Terrell.

East Texas

I-20 leaves the Dallas–Fort Worth metroplex and heads generally to the east-southeast through East Texas. I-20 begins heading to the east as it passes to the north of the city of Canton. The intersection of I-20 at US 69 in Lindale just north of Tyler is the highest traffic count intersection on I-20 east of Terrell to the Louisiana state line. From Lindale, I-20 continues east, going through the piney woods region of East Texas intersecting US 259 with Kilgore to the south and Longview to the north and US 59 future I-369 with Marshall just to the north and Texarkana further north along US 59 future I-369. I-20 leaves the state of Texas near Waskom and just west of the Shreveport, Bossier City, Louisiana area.

Auxiliary route
I-20 has one auxiliary route in Texas.

I-820 is a  loop around the city of Fort Worth. I-20 absorbed the southern section as part of its relocation to the south and I-30 being extended westward over the old alignment of I-20 through the center of town.

Business routes

All of the business loops within Texas are maintained by the Texas Department of Transportation (TxDOT). I-20 has fifteen business loops in the state, all located in western Texas. Along I-20, TxDOT identifies each business route as Business Interstate 20 (Bus. I-20) followed by an alphabetic suffix. Along Texas Interstates, the alphabetic suffixes on business route names ascend eastward and northward. There are gaps in the alphabetic values to allow for future system expansion. The alphabetic naming suffixes are included as small letters on the bottom of route shields.

State Highway Loop 254 (Loop 254) takes the place of a business route in Ranger, Texas, and follows the original route of US 80.

I-20 business routes in Texas generally follow the path of the former US 80 through the central portions of towns now bypassed by the Interstate route.

Exit list

See also

Notes

References

External links

I-20 info page -- from dfwfreeways.info

20
 Texas
Transportation in Callahan County, Texas
Transportation in Crane County, Texas
Transportation in Dallas County, Texas
Transportation in Eastland County, Texas
Transportation in Ector County, Texas
Transportation in Erath County, Texas
Transportation in Gregg County, Texas
Transportation in Harrison County, Texas
Transportation in Howard County, Texas
Transportation in Kaufman County, Texas
Transportation in Martin County, Texas
Transportation in Midland County, Texas
Transportation in Mitchell County, Texas
Transportation in Nolan County, Texas
Transportation in Palo Pinto County, Texas
Transportation in Parker County, Texas
Transportation in Reeves County, Texas
Transportation in Smith County, Texas
Transportation in Tarrant County, Texas
Transportation in Taylor County, Texas
Transportation in Van Zandt County, Texas
Transportation in Ward County, Texas